Jill Vernekohl (born 10 November 1980, in Bochum) is a German former ice dancer. With partner Dmitri Kurakin, she is the 2001 & 2002 German silver medalist. They competed for two seasons on the ISU Grand Prix of Figure Skating, with a highest placement of 8th at the 2001 Sparkassen Cup on Ice. Before teaming up with Kurakin, she competed with Jan Luggenhoelscher, winning medals on the Junior Grand Prix and competing twice at the World Junior Figure Skating Championships, placing 16th in 1997 and 11th in 1999.

References

External links
 Tracings.net profile

German female ice dancers
1980 births
Living people
Sportspeople from Bochum